James Capehart (March 7, 1847 – April 28, 1921) was a businessman and political figure in the Democratic Party from West Virginia. He served as a  United States Representative from West Virginia in the 52nd and 53rd Congresses.

Biography
Capehart was born in Point Pleasant in Mason County, Virginia (now West Virginia). He attended the public schools and went to Marietta College, Ohio. He also studied at Duff's Commercial College in Pittsburgh, Pennsylvania. He worked for his father as a  clerk and bookkeeper. From 1867 to 1903 he pursued an interest in agriculture and breeding  livestock. He served as  president of the Mason County Court in 1871, 1872, and again from 1880 to 1885.

In 1888 Capehart was chosen as a delegate to the Democratic National Convention. He was elected to his first term in Congress in 1890, and was re-elected in 1892, serving from 1891 to 1895 (March 4, 1891 – March 3, 1895; the 52nd and 53rd United States Congresses)

Capehart chose not to run for re-election in the 1894 contest. After returning to West Virginia, he worked as president of the Point Pleasant National Bank, beginning in 1901.

Around 1903 Capehart renewed his interest in agriculture, growing fruit in Brevard County, Florida. He lived in Cocoa, Florida until his death in 1921. He was buried in Lone Oak Cemetery, Point Pleasant, West Virginia.

See also
United States congressional delegations from West Virginia

Sources

1847 births
1921 deaths
American bank presidents
Marietta College alumni
People from Cocoa, Florida
People from Point Pleasant, West Virginia
Democratic Party members of the United States House of Representatives from West Virginia